Edna Ann Proulx (born August 22, 1935) is an American novelist, short story writer, and journalist. She has written most frequently as Annie Proulx but has also used the names E. Annie Proulx and E.A. Proulx.

She won the PEN/Faulkner Award for Fiction for her first novel, Postcards. Her second novel, The Shipping News (1993), won both the Pulitzer Prize for Fiction and the U.S. National Book Award for Fiction and was adapted as a 2001 film of the same name. Her short story "Brokeback Mountain" was adapted as an Academy Award, BAFTA and Golden Globe Award-winning motion picture released in 2005.

Personal life
Proulx was born Edna Ann Proulx in Norwich, Connecticut, to Lois Nellie ( Gill) and Georges-Napoléon Proulx. Her first name honored one of her mother's aunts. She is of English and French-Canadian ancestry. Her maternal forebears came to America in 1635, 15 years after the Mayflower arrived. 

She graduated from Deering High School in Portland, Maine, then attended Colby College "for a short period in the 1950s", where she met her first husband, H. Ridgely Bullock, Jr. She later returned to college, studying at the University of Vermont from 1966 to 1969, and graduated cum laude and Phi Beta Kappa with a B.A. in history in 1969. She earned her M.A. from Sir George Williams University (now Concordia University) in Montreal, Quebec in 1973 and pursued, but did not complete, a Ph.D. In 1999, Concordia awarded her an honorary doctorate.

Proulx lived for more than 30 years in Vermont, has married and divorced three times, and has three sons and a daughter (Jonathan, Gillis, Morgan, and Sylvia). In 1994, she moved to Saratoga, Wyoming, spending part of the year in northern Newfoundland on a small cove adjacent to L'Anse aux Meadows. As of 2019, Proulx lived in Port Townsend, Washington.

Writing career and recognition
Starting as a journalist, her first published work of fiction is "The Customs Lounge", a science fiction story published in the September 1963 issue of If, under the byline "E.A. Proulx". 

A year later, her science fiction story "All the Pretty Little Horses" appeared in the teen magazine Seventeen in June 1964. She subsequently published stories in Esquire magazine and Gray's Sporting Journal in the late 1970s, eventually publishing her first collection in 1988 and her first novel in 1992. She was awarded a NEA fellowship in 1992 and a Guggenheim fellowship in 1993.

She had the following comment on her celebrity status: 

In 1997, Proulx was awarded the Dos Passos Prize, a mid-career award for American writers. Proulx has twice won the O. Henry Prize for the year's best short story. In 1998, she won for "Brokeback Mountain", which had appeared in The New Yorker on October 13, 1997. Proulx won again the following year for "The Mud Below", which appeared in The New Yorker June 22 and 29, 1999. Both appear in her 1999 collection of short stories, Close Range: Wyoming Stories. The lead story in this collection, entitled "The Half-Skinned Steer", was selected by author Garrison Keillor for inclusion in The Best American Short Stories 1998, (Proulx herself edited the 1997 edition of this series) and later by novelist John Updike for inclusion in The Best American Short Stories of the Century (1999).

In 2007, the composer Charles Wuorinen approached Proulx with the idea of turning her short story "Brokeback Mountain" into an opera. The opera of the same name with a libretto by Proulx herself premiered January 28, 2014, at the Teatro Real in Madrid. It was praised as an often brilliant adaptation that clearly conveyed the text of the libretto with music that is rich in imagination and variety. In 2017, she received the Fitzgerald Award for that year for Achievement in American Literature.

Bibliography

Nonfiction

 Plan and Make Your Own Fences & Gates, Walkways, Walls & Drives (1983), 
The Fine Art of Salad Gardening. 1985. 
 The Gourmet Gardener: Growing Choice Fruits and Vegetables with Spectacular Results (1987), 

 Bird Cloud: A Memoir (2011), 
Foreword (2018) In: Wild Migrations: Atlas of Wyoming's Ungulates. Alethea Y. Steingisser, Emilene Ostlind, Hall Sawyer, James E. Meacham, Matthew J. Kauffman, and William J. Rudd (Eds.).
Fen, Bog & Swamp: A Short History of Peatland Destruction and Its Role in the Climate Crisis (2022)

Essay
 Swamps Can Protect Against Climate Change, If We Only Let Them. In: The New Yorker, June 27, 2022 (July 4, 2022).

Novels
 Postcards (1992), 
 The Shipping News (1993), 
 Accordion Crimes (1996), 
 That Old Ace in the Hole (2002), 
 Barkskins (2016),

Short fiction

Collections
 Heart Songs and Other Stories (1988), ; republished with altered but similar content as trade paperback Heart Songs (1994) 
 Close Range: Wyoming Stories (1999), 
 Bad Dirt: Wyoming Stories 2 (2004), 
 Fine Just the Way It Is: Wyoming Stories 3 (2008),

Stories

Awards and recognition
 1993—PEN/Faulkner Award for Fiction (Postcards)
 1993—Chicago Tribune Heartland Prize for Fiction The Shipping News
 1993—Irish Times International Fiction Prize The Shipping News
 1993—National Book Award, Fiction The Shipping News
 1994—Pulitzer Prize, Fiction The Shipping News
 1997—Shortlisted for the 1997 Orange Prize (Accordion Crimes)
 1997—John Dos Passos Prize for Literature (for body of work)
 1998—"Half-Skinned Steer", The Best American Short Stories 1998
 1998—"Brokeback Mountain", O. Henry Awards O. Henry Awards: Prize Stories 1998
 1998—"Brokeback Mountain", National Magazine Award
 1999—"The Mud Below," O. Henry Awards: Prize Stories 1999
 1999—"The Bunchgrass Edge of the World," The Best American Short Stories 1999
 1999—"Half-Skinned Steer", The Best American Short Stories of the Century, edited by John Updike
 2000—The New Yorker Book Award, Best Fiction 1999 (Close Range: Wyoming Stories)
 2000—English-Speaking Union's Ambassador Book Award (Close Range: Wyoming Stories)
 2000—"People in Hell Just Want a Drink of Water," The Best American Short Stories 2000
 2000—Borders Original Voices Award in Fiction (Close Range, Wyoming Stories)
 2000—WILLA Literary Award, Women Writing the West
 2002—Best Foreign Language Novels of 2002 / Best American Novel Award, Chinese Publishing Association and Peoples' Literature Publishing House (That Old Ace in the Hole)
 2004—Aga Khan Prize for Fiction for "The Wamsutter Wolf"
 2012—United States Artists Fellow award
 2017—National Book Foundation Medal for Distinguished Contribution to American Letters (lifetime achievement)
 2018—Library of Congress Prize for American Fiction

Adaptations
 The Shipping News (2001) was directed by Lasse Hallström and featured Kevin Spacey as the protagonist Quoyle, Judi Dench as Agnis Hamm and Julianne Moore as Wavey Prowse.
 Brokeback Mountain (2005), directed by Ang Lee and starring Heath Ledger and Jake Gyllenhaal, was based on a story of the same name in Proulx's collection of short stories, Close Range.
 Barkskins, a National Geographic television series based on Proulx's 2016 novel, premiered on May 25, 2020.

References

Further reading
 "Annie Proulx." Contemporary Authors Online. Detroit: Gale, 2011.
 Hennessy, Denis M. "Annie Proulx." American Short-Story Writers Since World War II: Fifth Series. Ed. Richard E. Lee and Patrick Meanor. Detroit: Gale, 2007. Dictionary of Literary Biography Vol. 335.

External links

Books That Changed My Life PEN World Voices at the New York Public Library May 4, 2008
An Interview with Annie Proulx, Bookslut, December 2005.
 Interview with Annie Proulx in the Fall 2005 Wyoming Library Roundup (PDF 3.69 MB)
 

1935 births
Living people
20th-century American novelists
21st-century American novelists
20th-century American women writers
21st-century American women writers
American women novelists
Postmodern writers
National Book Award winners
Pulitzer Prize for Fiction winners
PEN/Faulkner Award for Fiction winners
American people of English descent
American people of French-Canadian descent
Writers from Portland, Maine
Novelists from Connecticut
Novelists from Vermont
Writers from Wyoming
Colby College alumni
Sir George Williams University alumni
University of Vermont alumni
Concordia University alumni
The New Yorker people
Novelists from Maine
People from Saratoga, Wyoming
Deering High School alumni